The 2011 KPL Top 8 Cup was the inaugural edition of the tournament, which was contested by the top 8 teams of the 2010 Kenyan Premier League season: Gor Mahia, Karuturi Sports, Mathare United, Sofapaka, Sony Sugar, Tusker F.C., Ulinzi Stars (eventual winners) and Western Stima. All matches were played at the Nyayo National Stadium.

2010 Kenyan Premier League standings

Bracket

Quarter-finals
The quarter-final ties were played between 9 March and 13 April 2011.

Semi-finals
The first leg and second leg of the semi-finals were played between 20 April and 25 May 2011.

First leg

Second leg

Sofapaka 3–3 Western Stima on aggregate. Western Stima won on away goals (2–1).

Final
The final was played on 25 June 2011 between Ulinzi Stars and Western Stima.

References

External links
 Kenyan Premier League - Official Website
 Futaa.com - Top 8 Cup 2011

KPL Top 8 Cup seasons
Top 8 Cup